Buller is a former New Zealand parliamentary electorate, from 1871 to 1972. It was represented by eleven Members of Parliament.

Population centres
The 1870 electoral redistribution was undertaken by a parliamentary select committee based on population data from the 1867 New Zealand census. Eight sub-committees were formed, with two members each making decisions for their own province; thus members set their own electorate boundaries. The number of electorates was increased from 61 to 72, and Buller was one of the new electorates. Settlements located in the initial electorate area were Westport, Inangahua Junction, and Reefton.

History
Fisher retired at the end of the parliamentary term in 1881.

Patrick O'Regan won the 1896 election in the Buller electorate.

From 1919 the Buller electorate was represented by two radical trade unionists from the coal mines of the West Coast, Harry Holland and Paddy Webb. Harry Holland and then Jerry Skinner died in office.

In 1972, the electorate was split into the West Coast and Tasman electorates.

Members of Parliament
The Buller electorate was represented by eleven MPs:

Key

Election results

1969 election

1966 election

1963 election

1962 by-election

1960 election

1957 election

1954 election

1951 election

1949 election

1946 election

1933 by-election

1931 election

1928 election

1925 election

1922 election

1919 election

1914 election

1899 election

1893 election

1879 election

Notes

References

Historical electorates of New Zealand
1870 establishments in New Zealand
1972 disestablishments in New Zealand
Politics of the West Coast, New Zealand